Reginald Henry Morgan (9 October 1919 – 12 February 2002) was an Australian rules footballer who played with Carlton in the Victorian Football League (VFL).

Notes

External links 

Reg Morgan's profile at Blueseum

1919 births
Carlton Football Club players
Australian rules footballers from Victoria (Australia)
Northcote Football Club players
2002 deaths